Juan Malgosa (born 29 August 1959) is a Spanish field hockey player. He was born in Barcelona. He competed at the 1984 Summer Olympics in Los Angeles, where the Spanish team placed eighth. He also competed at the 1988 Summer Olympics in Seoul.

References

External links

1959 births
Living people
Field hockey players from Barcelona
Spanish male field hockey players
Olympic field hockey players of Spain
Field hockey players at the 1984 Summer Olympics
Field hockey players at the 1988 Summer Olympics